Adan, spelled Adán in Spanish, is a French, Somali and Spanish masculine given name, the equivalent to Adam.
 Adan Ahmed Elmi (born 1966), the fourth and current Prime Minister of Somaliland
 Adán Amezcua Contreras (born 1969), a leader of the Mexican Colima drug cartel
 Adán Balbín (born 1986), Peruvian footballer
 Adán Cárdenas (1836-1916), Nicaraguan politician and doctor
 Adán Chávez (born 1953), elder brother of Venezuelan president Hugo Chávez
 Adán Gurdiel (born 1993), Spanish footballer
 Adán Jodorowsky (born 1979), French actor and musician
 Adan Keynan Wehiye, Kenyan politician
 Adán Martín Menis (1943-2010), former president of the Canary Islands
 Adan Mohamed Nuur Madobe (born 1956), Somali politician and Speaker of Parliament
 Adán Pérez (born 1987), Spanish footballer.
 Adán Sánchez (1984-2004), popular Mexican-American singer
 Adán Vergara (born 1981), Chilean football (soccer) player

Others use 
 Adán the Orca, a killer whale at Loro Parque.
 Adan Mose, a fictional character in the 2016 video game Lego Star Wars: The Force Awakens

See also 
 Adan (disambiguation)

References 

Arabic masculine given names
Spanish masculine given names
Masculine given names